Amolops iriodes is a species of frog in the family Ranidae that is endemic to Vietnam.

Its natural habitats are subtropical or tropical moist montane forests, rivers, and intermittent freshwater marshes. It is threatened by habitat loss.

Sources

Amolops
Amphibians described in 2004
Amphibians of Vietnam
Endemic fauna of Vietnam
Taxonomy articles created by Polbot